A serotonin–dopamine releasing agent (SDRA) is a type of drug which induces the release of serotonin and dopamine in the body and/or brain.

A closely related type of drug is a serotonin–dopamine reuptake inhibitor (SDRI).

Examples of SDRAs
A number of tryptamine derivatives have been found to act as SDRAs.  One such agent is 5-chloro-αMT (PAL-542), which has been reported as having about 64-fold selectivity for dopamine release over norepinephrine release and about 3-fold selectivity for serotonin release over dopamine release, making it a highly selective and well-balanced SDRA. Another agent is 5-fluoro-αET (PAL-545), which has about 35-fold selectivity for dopamine release over norepinephrine release and about 4-fold selectivity for serotonin release over dopamine release. Though selective for inducing the release of serotonin and dopamine over norepinephrine, these agents are not selective monoamine releasers; they have all also been found to be potent agonists of the 5-HT2A receptor, and may act as agonists of other serotonin receptors as well.

UWA-101 is an SDRI that, based on its chemical structure, may also have a great efficacy as a releasing agent of serotonin and dopamine.

See also
 Monoamine releasing agent
 Serotonin releasing agent
 Dopamine releasing agent
 Serotonin–norepinephrine–dopamine releasing agent

References

Serotonin-dopamine releasing agents
TAAR1 agonists
VMAT inhibitors